San Pedru d'Arbas is one of 54 parish councils in Cangas del Narcea, a municipality within the province and autonomous community of Asturias, in northern Spain.

Its villages include: Caldeviḷḷa d'Arbas, La Ḷḷinde, Rubial, San Pedru d'Arbas and Sucarral.

References

Parishes in Cangas del Narcea